George Demos  is a former United States Securities and Exchange Commission prosecutor, and was a candidate for the Republican nomination for New York's 1st congressional district on New York State's Long Island. He is currently a partner at DLA Piper and an adjunct law professor at University of California at Davis Law School.

Early life
Demos is the grandson of immigrants. His mother was a public school teacher, and his father was an attorney in private practice. Demos grew up in New York City where he attended high school, and now lives in Holbrook, New York.

Demos received his B.A. from Columbia University, majoring in political science, and his J.D.  from Fordham Law School.

Career

Securities and Exchange Commission
Demos prosecuted white collar fraud as a prosecutor at the U.S. Securities and Exchange Commission (SEC) between 2002 and 2009.

Politics

Demos vied in 2010 for the Republican nomination to compete for the congressional seat of Democrat Tim Bishop on Long Island in New York State in the November 2010 election, coming in second in the primary.  His three-way primary included Christopher Nixon Cox, the grandson of President Richard Nixon and Randy Altschuler, a businessman.

John Jay LaValle, Suffolk County Republican chairman, opined in February 2010 that Demos was a qualified and "extraordinary" candidate for the Republican Party's nomination to be a congressman in the 1st District from eastern Long Island.  It was Demos's first run for office.

He used the strategy firm Shawmut Group, which was formed in 2008 by Mitt Romney's advisors.  In January 2010, Demos appointed to his political team  Rob Cole, a former advisor to former New York Governor George Pataki, and a member of Romney's 2008 campaign team.  That month, Demos also announced that he had raised more than $300,000 for his campaign.  At the end of 2009, his campaign had $275,000.  He also issued his first TV ad, a 30-second commercial that attacked Bishop for supporting "reckless" fiscal policy.

In April 2010, Demos said that the Suffolk Conservatives were "inexplicably" preparing to endorse Altschuler.  Demos called Altschuler a "pro-choice, outsourcing proponent" and former member of the Green Party, which embraces "radical Marxist ideologies." In July 2010 he issued a new radio ad, in which he identified himself as the "only Conservative" in the contest.  That month he also said that Tea Party members had been supporting his candidacy.

In August 2010, he accused Altschuler of stealing another candidate's press releases, pointing to identical releases from Altschuler and Doug Hoffman, a candidate in for another New York congressional seat who uses the same consultant on some issues.  That month he also accused rival Chris Cox of using his father-in-law to-be, Catsimatidis, for "dirty tricks".

That month he also objected to the proposed construction of the Park51 community center near Ground Zero.  He said that the St. Nicholas Greek Orthodox Church, the only religious structure destroyed in the 9/11 attacks, should be rebuilt before moving forward on building an Islamic community center in the area, and called for an investigation into the center's financing.  In the days leading up to the primary, Conservative radio host Rush Limbaugh did a "six-minute radio riff in support of George Demos in NY-1, calling the former SEC attorney the only conservative in the race."

In the September 2010 primary, Altschuler finished first with 45 percent of the vote, Demos had 30 percent, and Cox was third with 24 percent.

2012 Congressional campaign
Demos announced another run for Congress Monday, August 8, 2011.  Shortly after his announcement, Demos called Randy Altschuler, the other announced Republican candidate, "unelectable" for losing in a district with a 30,000 Republican voter edge in 2010. Demos also chided Altschuler for taking the same position as incumbent Congressman Tim Bishop on the 2011 debt ceiling compromise.

Citing his impending wedding, Demos withdrew from the race May 25, 2012.

2014 Congressional campaign

On October 6, 2013, he announced he would seek the Republican nomination to run against Congressman Tim Bishop. On June 24, 2014 he lost the primary election to New York State Senator Lee Zeldin.

Whistleblower controversy and dismissal

In June 2011, it was reported by the Project On Government Oversight that the Appellate Division of the Supreme Court of the State of New York reopened an investigation into Demos for allegedly disclosing the identity of a JPMorgan Chase whistleblower while Demos served as an attorney at the SEC. Initially the 10th Judicial District Grievance Committee disposed of the allegations. However, the court committee transferred the investigation to "avoid the appearance of impropriety." In a letter dated September 23, 2011, the Third Judicial Department dismissed the matter again, stating "the Committee has determined that there is an insufficient basis for a finding of professional misconduct."

Personal life 
Demos is married to Chrysa Tsakopoulos, daughter of the real estate developer Angelo Tsakopoulos. His sister-in-law, Eleni Kounalakis, is the current Lieutenant Governor of California. She served as the United States Ambassador to Hungary from 2010 to 2013 and was the first Greek American woman to serve as ambassador.

References

External links
George Demos for Congress

American people of Greek descent
Columbia College (New York) alumni
New York (state) Republicans
Living people
Fordham University School of Law alumni
People from Shelter Island, New York
1976 births
People from Holbrook, New York
UC Davis School of Law faculty